Archibald Herbert Pratt (31 January 1882 – 29 August 1941) was an Australian rules footballer who played for the South Melbourne Football Club, St Kilda Football Club and Melbourne Football Club in the Victorian Football League (VFL).

Family
He was the son of Vincent William Pratt (1840–1915), and Elizabeth Pratt, née Rettie.

Notes

External links 
 
 	
 Archie Pratt's playing statistics from The VFA Project
 Archie Pratt playing statistics from Demonwiki

1882 births
Australian rules footballers from Victoria (Australia)
Sydney Swans players
St Kilda Football Club players
Melbourne Football Club players
North Melbourne Football Club (VFA) players
Northcote Football Club players
1941 deaths